Alexander George Pike (born 8 February 1997) is a former English footballer who plays as a defender most recently  for  West Ham United.

Career

West Ham United
Pike joined West Ham United as an under-11 team player as a midfielder, joining from non-league side Buckhurst Hill, before converting to play as a right-back as a schoolboy. He was first included in a West Ham matchday squad for their UEFA Europa League second qualifying round first leg fixture away to Birkirkara of Malta on 16 July 2015, remaining an unused substitute in a 1–0 victory at the Boleyn Ground. With manager Slaven Bilić putting priority on the team's Premier League performance, he made an array of changes for their third qualifying round second leg away to FC Astra Giurgiu on 6 August, and Pike made his debut as an added-time substitute for Lewis Page in a 2–1 defeat which saw his team eliminated.
In April 2018, after 11 years with the club, his contract was terminated by mutual consent.

Cheltenham Town loan
On 12 January 2017, Pike joined Cheltenham Town on loan for the rest of the season. Pike made his debut for Cheltenham Town on 14 January 2017 in a 3–0 home win against Accrington Stanley.

Personal life
Following his release from West Ham, Pike quit football in favour of working in the City of London.

Career statistics

References

External links
 
 

1997 births
Living people
Footballers from the London Borough of Waltham Forest
English footballers
Association football defenders
West Ham United F.C. players
Cheltenham Town F.C. players
English Football League players